NH 86 may refer to:

 National Highway 86 (India)
 New Hampshire Route 86, United States